Jon Amtrup (born 1968) is a Norwegian author, journalist and sailor.

He has written Havneguiden 4 Bergen-Kirkenes (Skagerrak Forlag, 2010), Ramsalt – Shetland Race 25 år (2010), Sail to Svalbard (Skagerrak Forlag, 2011), Kong Harald V – seileren som ble en av gutta (Skagerrak Forlag, 2012), High Latitude Sailing: How to sail the cold waters of the world (Explore North, 2014) and Norske Kystperler - hvordan og hvorfor seile verdens vakreste kyst (Explore North, 2015).

He has an extensive sailing background including two Transatlantic crossings, seven Bergen–Shetland races, a lot of solo- and double-handed sailing in Norway and the North Sea. The last five years he has sailed the Norwegian coast a number of times and also circumnavigated Svalbard. He often assists other sailors who ventures into the high latitudes. He is a member of The Explorers Club and Royal Geographical Society.

He has studied journalism, political science, Eastern European history and sociology. Amtrup runs the adventure company Explore North.

External links
https://web.archive.org/web/20110826021955/http://amtrup.seilmagasinet.no/
http://explorenorth.no/

1968 births
Norwegian male writers
Norwegian sailors
21st-century Norwegian journalists
Living people